Robinson Ekspeditionen: 2000, was the third season of the Danish version of the Swedish show Expedition Robinson and it premiered on 3 September 2000 and aired until 3 December 2000. The early part of the season saw the North team's domination of challenges and the formation of an alliance in both teams. The first of these alliances was South team's "C Team" alliance, which was composed of the younger members of the tribe, Birger Jensen, Christina Vilsøe, Frank Markussen, and Signe Ilkjær. This alliance was quickly broken up when in episode 3 Christina was injured and her fellow tribe members were forced to vote her out and when Signe betrayed her fellow alliance members by voting with Brigitte Hoff and Jens Jensen to eliminate Birger. The other, more successful alliance, formed early on in the North team. This alliance, composed of Kim Møller-Nielsen, Lærke Bregenhøj, Pia Rosholm, and Sonny Petersen created a voting block that would prove powerful throughout the season. Two episodes(episode 9 to be specific) after the teams initially merged, there was a vote to decide which of the eliminated contestants would return to the game. Christina won the vote and entered the game, but was soon voted out once again. The North team alliance having eventually picked off all merge members outside of their alliance composed the final four, with members Pia and Sonny eventually making up the final two. The jury this season was composed of the last eight players eliminated with the public awarding five jury votes as well. Ultimately, it was Sonny Petersen who won the season over Pia Rosholm with a jury vote of 8-5. Sonny was revealed to have received two of the three public jury votes as well as Anton, Brigitte, Christina, Ebbe, Frank, and Signe's votes.

Finishing order

Voting history

External links
http://www.bt.dk/nyheder/robinson-deltagerne-aargang-2000
http://www.bt.dk/nyheder/sexede-sild-i-aarets-robinson 

Robinson Ekspeditionen seasons
2000 Danish television seasons